The Australian state of Tasmania has one of the longest traditions of cricket-playing in the southern hemisphere.  Cricket is recorded as having first been played in Tasmania very shortly after the arrival of British settlers on the island on 12 September 1803, however it wasn't until nearly fifty years later that First-class cricket was to be played there.

Despite the long wait since the foundation of the colony, Tasmania played in the first ever first-class cricket match in Australia, which was played on 11 February and 12 February 1851, against Victoria, with Tasmania emerging victorious by 3 wickets. For that first match, Tasmania was captained by John Marshall.

Following that first ever First-class match Tasmania endured a long period of isolation, in which the island's cricketers had to content themselves with occasional First-class matches against other colonies, primarily Victoria, and touring or representative sides.

Australia's elite First-class cricket competition, the Sheffield Shield was established in 1892, however Tasmania was not invited to participate in that elite competition until 1977, and even then, their first four seasons were on a limited fixture list.

These are lists of the men who have been the official Tasmanian captains in First-class, List A and Twenty20 domestic matches. 
Where a player has a dagger (†) after his period of captaincy, that denotes that player deputised for the appointed captain. The dagger classification follows that adopted by Wisden Cricketers' Almanack.

First-class captains
This is a list of cricketers who have captained the Tasmanian cricket team for at least one First-class match. It is complete up to the 2018/19 season.

Notes:
 Where there are periods of time in which it appears there is no captain, it is because prior to Tasmania's entry into the Sheffield Shield they often went for periods in which the state played no first class cricket.
 Jack Simmons captained Tasmania to their first ever win in a Sheffield Shield match in against Western Australia, who they beat by 4 wickets on 30 January 1979.
 Whilst Ricky Ponting was in effect the Tasmanian cricket captain from 2001/02 until he announced he was standing down on 21 November 2007, this was primarily a ceremonial appointment in order to have the Australian captain as Tasmanian captain as well. In effect Daniel Marsh, his Vice-Captain, has performed the captaincy duties on most occasions, and was appointed outright following Ponting standing aside.
Daniel Marsh captained Tasmania to their first ever Pura Cup title in 2006/07, when they beat the New South Wales Blues by 421 runs in the final on 23 March 2007.
Source: Cricinfo Australian Domestic Seasons

List A captains
Despite not participating in the Sheffield Shield at that time, Tasmania was included in the inaugural List A cricket competition in Australia that began in 1969/70, and has participated in every subsequent season.
This is a complete list of every man who has captained the Tasmanian Tigers in List A cricket.

Notes:
Source: Cricinfo Australian Domestic Seasons
All statistics correct as of 19 October 2016.

Twenty20 captains

Tasmania played their first Twenty20 cricket match against the Queensland Bulls on 6 January 2006, however the match ended with no result. Below is the record of all the men who have captained Tasmania in Twenty20 cricket matches.

Notes:

Source: Cricinfo Australian Domestic Seasons

All statistics correct as of 1 February 2011.

See also
List of Tasmanian representative cricketers
Tasmanian Tigers

References
Cricinfo Australian Domestic Seasons

 
Tasmania
Cricket captains
Tasmania captains